This is a list of notable persons with the surname Coon.

 Adam Coon (born 1994), American wrestler and football player
 Bill Coon (born 1959), Canadian jazz guitarist and composer
 Carleton Coon, (1893–1932) co-founder of and drummer for the Coon-Sanders Original Nighthawk Orchestra
 Carleton S. Coon (1904–1981), American physical anthropologist and academic
 Caroline Coon (born 1945), English artist, journalist and activist
 Carrie Coon (born 1981), American actress
 Charles Coon (bridge) (1931–2003), American bridge player
 Charles E. Coon (1842–1920), American politician
 Charles L. Coon (1868–1927), teacher, school administrator and child labor reformer
 David Coon (born 1956), Canadian politician
 Edward William Coon, (1871–1934), American inventor of a maturation process for cheese after whom Coon cheese was named
 Eugene Coon (1929–1998), American law enforcement official
 Gene L. Coon (1924–1973), American screenwriter and television producer
 Henry Perrin Coon (1822–1884), American politician, doctor, businessman and teacher
 Jabez Coon (1869–1935), Australian politician
 James H. Coon (1914–1996), American physicist and academic
 Jeremy Coon (born 1979), American film producer
 Jessica Coon, American linguist and academic
 John Coon (sailor) (1929–2010), Australian sailor and Olympic athlete
 John Elton Coon (1907–1993), American politician
 John Saylor Coon (1854–1938), American mechanical engineer and academic
 Jonathan C. Coon (born 1970), American businessman
 Joshua Coon, American chemist and academic
 Larry Coon (born 1962), American computer scientist 
 L. H. Coon (1842–1903), American politician
 Mandy Coon, American fashion designer
 Mary Coon Walters (née Coon, 1922–2001), American judge
 Minor J. Coon (1921–2018), American biochemist and academic
 Matthew Coon Come (born 1956), Canadian politician and activist
 Reuben W. Coon (1842–1908), American lawyer, newspaper editor, and politician
 S. Park Coon (1820–1883), American politician and soldier
 Sam Coon (1903–1980), American politician
 Ty Coon (1915–1992), American football player
 William Coon (1855–1915), American baseball player

See also
 Koon (disambiguation)

Lists of people by surname
English-language surnames